The World is a Stage: Stories behind Pictures was an art exhibition held at the Mori Art Museum, Roppongi Hills Mori Tower 53F, Tokyo, Japan, from 29 March to 19 June 2005

"This exhibition examines how in contemporary art, fiction, fantasy or narrative have recently become an important medium through which artists describe, exorcise or critique a real world which seems full of conflict and anxiety." David Elliot, Director, Mori Art Museum

Artists
 Eija-Liisa Ahtila (Finland)
 Jananne Al-Ani  ( UK)
 Gregory Crewdson (USA)
 Stefan Exler (Germany)
 Teresa Hubbard / Alexander Birchler (USA/Switzerland)
 Leiko Ikemura (Japan / Germany)
 William Kentridge (South Africa)
 Konoike Tomoko  (Japan)
 Tracey Moffatt (Australia)
 Odani Motohiko  (Japan)
 Anneè Olofsson  (Sweden)
 Kara Walker  (USA)
 Mark Wallinger  (UK)
 Karen Yasinsky  (USA)

Curators
 Natsumi Araki Curator
 Kenichi Kondo Assistant Curator

References
"The World is a Stage: Stories behind Pictures" Japanese/English, editor: Natsumi Araki, authors: David Elliot, Director; Natsumi Araki, Takayuki Tatsumi, Kamiya Yukie  C0071

External links
MORI ART MUSEUM [The World is a Stage: Stories Behind Pictures]

Contemporary art exhibitions
Sculpture exhibitions
2005 in Japan
Culture in Tokyo
2005 in art